This is a list of Disney villain characters often based on animated fictional characters who have been featured as part of the Disney character line-up. Some of these villain characters have appeared in sequels, video games, comic books, stage productions, or live-action adaptations of the original films.

Much like with the Disney Princess line with Disney's princess characters, the company's villain characters are also often grouped together as part of a Disney Villains franchise.

List of villains 

The characters listed here are featured in Disney productions and merchandise as "official" villains.

Primary villains
These characters are seen in most current Disney Villains related merchandise, live events, attractions, etc.

Evil Queen (Snow White and the Seven Dwarfs)
Chernabog (Fantasia)
Queen of Hearts (Alice in Wonderland)
Captain Hook (Peter Pan)
Maleficent (Sleeping Beauty)
Cruella de Vil (101 Dalmatians)

Ursula (The Little Mermaid)
Jafar (Aladdin)
Scar (The Lion King)
Hades (Hercules)
Dr. Facilier (The Princess and the Frog)

Minor villains
These characters appear or have appeared in the franchise less frequently.

Amos Slade (The Fox and the Hound)
Aunt Sarah & Si and Am (Lady and the Tramp)
AUTO (WALL-E)
Big Bad Wolf (Three Little Pigs)
Br'er Fox and Br'er Bear (Song of the South)
Bruce (Finding Nemo)
Bowler Hat Guy (Meet the Robinsons)
Cad Spinner (Planes: Fire & Rescue)
Captain Gantu & Jumba Jookiba (Lilo & Stitch)
Charles F. Muntz (Up)
Carnotaurus (Dinosaur)
Chef Skinner (Ratatouille)
Chick Hicks (Cars)
Claude Frollo (The Hunchback of Notre Dame)
Clayton (Tarzan)
Dawn Bellwether (Zootopia)
Dragon (Toy Story 4)
Edgar Balthazar (The Aristocats)
Ernesto de la Cruz (Coco)
Evelyn Deavor (Incredibles 2)
Gaston (Beauty and the Beast)
Hopper & Molt (A Bug's Life)
Horned King (The Black Cauldron)
John Silver & Scroop (Treasure Planet)
King Candy (Wreck-It Ralph)
Lady Tremaine, Anastasia and Drizella, & Lucifer (Cinderella)
Lotso (Toy Story 3)
Lyle Tiberius Rourke (Atlantis: The Lost Empire)
Madam Mim (The Sword in the Stone)

Madame Medusa (The Rescuers)
Miles Axlerod & Professor Z (Cars 2)
Mor'du (Brave)
Mother Gothel (Tangled)
Oogie Boogie (The Nightmare Before Christmas)
Percival C. McLeach (The Rescuers Down Under)
Pete (Mickey Mouse & Friends)
Prince Hans & Duke of Weselton (Frozen)
Prince John, Sir Hiss, & Sheriff of Nottingham (Robin Hood)
The Prospector & Emperor Zurg (Toy Story 2)
Randall Boggs & Henry J. Waternoose (Monsters, Inc.)
Ratcliffe (Pocahontas)
Ratigan (The Great Mouse Detective)
The Ringmaster (Dumbo)
Ripslinger (Planes)
Shan Yu (Mulan)
Shere Khan & Kaa (The Jungle Book)
Sanderson Sisters (Hocus Pocus)
Sid Phillips & Scud (Toy Story)
Stromboli, & Honest John and Gideon (Pinocchio)
Sykes (Oliver & Company)
Syndrome (The Incredibles)
Tamatoa (Moana)
Thunderclap (The Good Dinosaur)
Yokai (Big Hero 6)
Yzma & Kronk (The Emperor's New Groove)

Merchandising
In August 2018, a strategy game titled Disney Villainous was designed by Prospero Hall, published by Ravensburger and released exclusively to Target stores. The game has players compete as Disney Villains attempting to accomplish their goals from the film, while simultaneously trying to slow down their opponents. As of March 2021, four standalone expansions have released, with each adding three different playable villains.

Villain merchandise was available at the former Villains in Vogue store in Sunset Blvd, at Disney's Hollywood Studios. This first store was so successful that the Disneyland Villain Shop was opened afterwards in 1991. Both of these have since now closed.

USAopoly has released a number of products featuring Disney villains. Among them is a Monopoly-based board game called My Disney Villains Monopoly, where the players decide which of 30 villains can appear on each space on the board (characters that appear in the game that are not part of the official Villain list include Beagle Boys, Three Little Wolves, Pom-Pom, Man, Hound Dogs, and Chief); a checkers game; and a collector's card game set.

An online Disney trivia game called Who Wants to be a Villionaire, released in October 2001, is loosely based on Who Wants to Be a Millionaire? and features several villains as hosts, asking questions about the film in which they are featured. The "Phone-a-Friend" feature is renamed "Phone-a-Fiend" and will connect the player to Cruella de Vil.

There is a sub-franchise derived from Disney villains entitled Disney's Divas of Darkness. The line-up includes Maleficent, the Evil Queen, Cruella de Vil, Ursula, and the Queen of Hearts.

The Villains Designer Collection re-imagines the stylish wickedness of Disney villains. This line of merchandise includes Maleficent, Cruella de Vil, the Evil Queen, the Queen of Hearts, Ursula and Mother Gothel.

The Vinylmation collection also includes a Villains series.

Books 
Several books dedicated to Disney villains have been released. Among them are: 

 Disney Villains: The Top Secret Files by Jeff Kurtti;
 Disney's The Villains Collection: Stories from the Films by Todd Strasser;
 Disney's Villains: A Pop-Up Book by Walt Disney Company;
 Disney Villains: The Essential Guide by DK Publishing;
 Disney Villains (Ultimate Sticker Books) by DK Publishing;
 Disney Villains: The Essential Guide to the Evilest of Them All by DK Publishing.

There are also books to color, like Disney Villains: All the Rage and Disney Villains Giant Book to Color ~ Diabolical Deeds!

Live events
Several characters from the Disney villains make meet-and-greet appearances at various Walt Disney Parks and Resorts locations. Previous parades such as Disney's Hollywood Studios' Disney Stars and Motor Cars Parade, SpectroMagic and Disney's Once Upon a Dream Parade featured a float dedicated to villains, and Parade of Dreams (an Ursula float). The villains are also meetable characters at the Walt Disney Parks and Resorts.

A 1999 exhibit at the Cartoon Art Museum entitled "The Disney Villains" included displays featuring Disney's official villains, along with other villainous characters such as the Hunter from Bambi, and Br'er Fox & Br'er Bear from Song of the South.

Fantasmic!
Disney villains play a vital role in the nighttime show Fantasmic!, performed at the Disneyland and Disney's Hollywood Studios theme parks. In the shows, the Evil Queen decides it is time to finish off Mickey Mouse once and for all, and invokes other villains to help her.

Mickey's Not-So-Scary Halloween Party
Disney villains appear in Mickey's Not-So-Scary Halloween Party, a Halloween-themed event held annually during the months of September and October at the Magic Kingdom theme park of the Walt Disney World Resort and at Disneyland Paris Resort. A stage show and meet-and-greet with the villains led by Dr. Facilier (and prior to 2011 by Maleficent) titled "The Disney Villains Mix and Mingle" is held on the Cinderella Castle Forecourt Stage. Among those to visit are the Queen of Hearts, Captain Hook, and the Evil Queen among others. During the fireworks show HalloWishes some villains arrive to the celebration, starting with Ursula "plopping in" on the party and adding her own musical mix to the festivities. Jafar and Oogie Boogie (from The Nightmare Before Christmas) soon follow, and arriving last is Maleficent showing the audience how Halloween should really be celebrated.

Dream Along with Mickey
In the Dream Along with Mickey stage show at Walt Disney World's Magic Kingdom, the Disney villains appear onstage to threaten Mickey Mouse, Minnie Mouse, Donald Duck and Goofy. Maleficent states that since people no longer believe in dreams, it is the perfect time for her to return to power and make the Magic Kingdom "The Place Where Nightmares Come True"—a play on the Walt Disney Parks and Resorts slogan of "The Place Where Dreams Come True." She is also accompanied by Captain Hook.

Villains Tonight
The Disney villains star as the main characters in the Disney Cruise lines' variety show, Villains Tonight. This musical stage production features Hades on a quest to get more evil in the Underworld by summoning up Disney's most powerful villains so he can keep his job. This show features Maleficent, Jafar, the Evil Queen, Cruella de Vil, Captain Hook, Scar, Yzma, Ursula, and Chernabog in a variety of comical situations while performing various musical numbers from their respective appearances. This show debuted on the Disney Magic cruise ship March 27, 2010, and the Disney Dream on January 26, 2012.

Video games

Disney's Villains' Revenge
Disney's Villains' Revenge is a 1999 video game which tells the story of how the Evil Queen, Captain Hook, Queen of Hearts, and the Ringmaster change the story from the original movie to the way they wanted the story to end, with no "Happily Ever After".

Kingdom Hearts series
In the Kingdom Hearts series of action role-playing games developed and published by Disney Interactive Studios and Square Enix, Disney villains play a major role as they seek to harness the power of darkness. The villains are antagonists in different worlds, such as the Villains group led by Maleficent, with Pete as her main henchman, Hades in Olympus, Jafar in Agrabah, Ursula in Atlantica, Oogie Boogie in Halloween Town, Captain Hook in Neverland, and Scar in the Pride Land. Other villain in the group outside the official line-up is Captain Barbossa of Port Royal.

Other Disney Villains in the games are Queen of Hearts in Wonderland, Clayton in Deep Jungle, Chernabog in End of the World & Symphony of Sorcery, Shan Yu in the Land of Dragons, The Evil Queen in Dwarf Woodlands, Lady Tremaine, Anastasia and Drizella in Castle of Dreams, Captain Gantu in Deep Space, Claude Frollo in La Cité des Cloches, Gaston in Beast's Castle, King Candy in Candy Kingdom, Mother Gothel in Kingdom of Corona, Randall Boggs in Monstropolis, and Hans in Arendelle.

Other villains outside the official line-up that also make appearances include  Sabor in Deep Jungle, the Master Control Program & Sark in Space Paranoids, CLU & Rinzler in The Grid, the Beagle Boys in Country of the Musketeers, Julius in Traverse Town, and Davy Jones & Cutler Beckett in The Caribbean. Monstro, the whale from Pinocchio, is both a character and a location as well as a boss in Kingdom Hearts Birth by Sleep Final Mix.

Epic Mickey series
Epic Mickey introduces new villains to the world of Disney, most of which are from old-style Disney movies and attractions. In the first game, Mickey unwittingly creates a monster called the Shadow Blot (not to be confused with the Phantom Blot). As Mickey tries to get rid of it, Yen Sid approaches and Mickey is forced to flee, leaving some of the Blot undestroyed. Years later, the Blot has Mickey kidnapped so that his heart can be used to escape Wasteland. With Oswald's help, Mickey returns home as the Blot is defeated.

In the second game, The Mad Doctor tries to rule in the Shadow Blot's stead. In the first game, the Mad Doctor supplied robots for the Blot. If the player choose the Hero path, The Mad Doctor turns from a robot into a toon. If the player chooses the Scrapper path, The Mad Doctor is left in the final battle room to rot. Lastly, at the end of the second game, several versions of Pete look like they're going to try to take over the Wasteland.

Other media

Television
Characters from the franchise have been featured in television specials. The first, Our Unsung Villains, was aired in 1956 as part of Walt Disney Presents. In the special, Walt Disney himself hands hosting duties over to the Magic Mirror, who hosts a show devoted to Disney villains such as the Big Bad Wolf, the Evil Queen and Captain Hook, and Br'er Fox and Br'er Bear.

In 1977, there was an update to this show entitled Disney's Greatest Villains, that featured the Evil Queen and Captain Hook again, along with nine other characters from the franchise, plus Willie the Giant. Segments from this special were featured in A Disney Halloween.

A handful of alternate versions of Disney Villains appear in the ABC fantasy drama television series Once Upon a Time. A notable case of their appearances is in the fourth season, where Maleficent, Ursula and Cruella De Vil form a group known as the Queens of Darkness.

In The Simpsons short Welcome to the Club, several Disney Villains, among them Evil Queen (in her witch form), Queen of Hearts, Captain Hook, Maleficent, Cruella de Vil, Ursula, Kaa, Jafar, Scar, and Hades, try to show Lisa Simpson through a musical number how much fun being a villain can be.

Descendants 
The Disney Villains are a main focus in the Descendants franchise.

In the Disney Channel Original Movie Descendants appear Maleficent, the Evil Queen, Jafar and Cruella de Vil, along with their children, Mal, Evie, Jay and Carlos, respectively. They live on The Isle of the Lost, an island where all of Disney's villains and their various sidekicks have been imprisoned, along with all the other villains and their children. Mal, Evie, Jay, and Carlos were chosen by Prince Ben (son of King Beast and Queen Belle) to live in The United States of Auradon.

In the animated series Descendants: Wicked World, appear Freddie, Dr. Facilier's daughter, CJ, Captain Hook's daughter, and Zevon, Yzma's son.

In the sequel, Descendants 2, Uma, Harry and Gil, children of Ursula, Captain Hook and Gaston, appear as the main antagonists. Dizzy, Drizella's daughter, also appear as a more friendly character. Maleficent appear in a lizard form, having that appearance after the events in the previous film, while Ursula yells at her daughter from the kitchen in her restaurant, only one of her tentacles visible, and Lady Tremaine is simply heard yelling at her granddaughter from upstairs in her hairdresser.

In the third film, Descendants 3, appear Hades, Dr. Facilier, Lady Tremaine, and Mr. Smee. Celia, Dr. Facilier's daughter, and Squeaky and Squirmy, Mr. Smee's twin sons, are also introduced.

A fourth film in development, The Pocketwatch, will feature Queen of Hearts, and teen versions of her, Maleficent, Hades, and Captain Hook. The film will also introduce Red, Queen of Hearts' daughter.

Direct-to-video films

Mickey's House of Villains
The Disney Villains star in Mickey's House of Villains, the 2002 film adaptation of the Disney Channel animated television series Disney's House of Mouse. Set during a Halloween party, Jafar the leader, takes over the house with a musical number of "It's Our House Now", and all the other villains in the house join in. In the process, Jafar trap all the heroes in the kitchen, throw Mickey and the others out into the street, and change the House's name to the "House of Villains". Mickey, Donald, Goofy and Minnie Mouse in turn try to return things to normal, but Chernabog keeps throwing them out. Afterwards, Mickey dresses in his famous sorcerer outfit from Fantasia and challenges Jafar to a magical duel using fireballs. Mickey's sorcerer hat is bounced off and there is very little time to put it back on, but then Aladdin saves the day by escaping the kitchen to the backstage room on the magic carpet and giving Daisy who gives Mickey the lamp to trap Jafar. Mickey sucks Jafar into the lamp, while the rest of the villains flee, restoring the house to normal.

Once Upon a Halloween
In the film Once Upon a Halloween, on the night before Halloween, the Evil Queen from Snow White and the Seven Dwarfs plans to conquer Halloween, and asks her cauldron to show the viewer several villains to which one of them helps her in her plan. Among them, Peg Leg Pete, Ursula, Captain Hook, Yzma, Professor Ratigan, Alameda Slim, Judge Claude Frollo, and Horned King are the ones with a main focus.

Novels

Kingdom Keepers
In Kingdom Keepers, Disney villains form a group known as the "Overtakers".

Board games

Disney Villainous 
The Villainous board game franchise, published by Ravensburger, puts players in the roles of Disney villains. It has been praised by critics and fans for its lush artwork and easy-to-learn yet compelling strategy elements. The game is unique in that it features an asymmetrical structure, with players working to complete their own unique goals. The core game, The Worst Takes It All, has been followed up with five expansions (to date): Wicked to the Core, Evil Comes Prepared, Perfectly Wretched, Despicable Plots, and Bigger and Badder.

Legacy
Disney villains proved their mark in cinematic history when the American Film Institute named The Queen from Snow White and the Seven Dwarfs as the 10th-greatest movie villain of all time. Other Disney Villains on AFI's list were the hunter from Bambi and Cruella de Vil from 101 Dalmatians. AFI did not rely on Disney's classification of who qualified as a villain, but used this definition instead:

a "villain" was defined as a character(s) whose wickedness of mind, selfishness of character and will to power are sometimes masked by beauty and nobility, while others may rage unmasked. They can be horribly evil or grandiosely funny, but are ultimately tragic.

See also
 Disney Consumer Products
 Disney Princess
 Disney Fairies

References

Further reading
 Thomas, Frank and Johnston, Ollie, The Disney Villain (1993) , 

Villains
 
Disney